On the Run is a series of children's novels written by Gordon Korman. It tells a story about two children who try to clear their parents' names, while they are also being hunted by the authorities themselves. The series has six books in total and was published in 2005 through 2006. The series also has a sequel series entitled Kidnapped, which follows the children after this series.

Books
Chasing the Falconers — Aiden and Meg Falconer escape from Sunnydale juvenile detention farm to prove their parents are innocent by finding their Uncle Frank Lindenauer, a family friend. They also discovered a killer named Hairless Joe.
The Fugitive Factor — The Falconers go to Boston and talk to Frank Lindenauer's former girlfriend Aunt Jane, but she calls the cops on them and Meg is captured and thrown in jail. And Aiden rescued her.
Now You See Them, Now You Don't — Aiden and Meg fly to Los Angeles and receive help from a street gang called the International Crew led by Bo. They go into town to see around and find a poster with 'Frank Linder' on it and they call the number on the poster. But it was a trap by Hairless Joe.
The Stowaway Solution — The siblings stowaway on a ship to get closer to escape the police. They get captured on the ship but, escape on an inflatable raft. Meg gets purposely hit by a car to be able to get to the same hospital as Aiden and handcuffs Emmanuel Harris the FBI agent to a radiator while in the hospital and escape with Harris' car.
Public Enemies — The Falconers discover the true identity of the man Hairless Joe, who has been routinely trying to kill them.
Hunting the Hunter — The Falconers track down Frank Lindenauer to free their parents.

Characters

Aiden Falconer
Aiden Falconer is 15 years old. He tries his best to take care of his 11-year-old sister Meg. Their parents are sentenced to life in a maximum security prison. Aiden and Meg both believe their parents are innocent, and now they are trying to find proof. Aiden is always extremely patient, as in book three, but Margaret (Meg) is the complete opposite. He is pretty smart for his age. Aiden is nice to his sister.

Meg Falconer
Margaret Falconer is 11 years old and the younger sister of Aiden Falconer. She prefers to be called "Meg". Meg is very determined once she sets her mind on something. Meg only sees the good in things and is positive that her parents are innocent and that they were framed.

Miguel Reyes
Reyes is a convict who lives at Sunnydale Farm, known for being in juvie multiple times. He was committed most recently for manslaughter, because he pushed his abusive stepfather down the stairs. It is an accident, as is revealed in book 1. He is mostly a minor character in the first book, in which he becomes an unlikely ally for Aiden and Meg, providing them with much knowledge on how to be a fugitive. When Meg and Aiden are sent to a high security prison in book six, it's shown that Miguel  was sent there after he left the hospital. He is originally a bully towards Aiden in book one, but later Aiden considers him to be his best friend. He is captured near the end of book one when Hairless Joe mistakes him for Aiden. He helps the kids to break into a house and steal money from the vending machine.

Emmanuel Harris
Harris is the FBI agent who cracked open the case of the Falconers. He was promoted and given much praise for his success in the case. However, he lives with much guilt that he might have put the wrong people in prison. He also attempts to hunt down the Falconer kids because he feels it is his fault that they became fugitives in the first place. He is 6' 7" and has an addiction to coffee. Meg's nickname for him is 
"J. Edgar Giraffe". At the end of the series, Aiden's employer, a farmer named Zephraim Turnbull shoots Harris, thinking he is Hairless Joe, and the Falconers believe he is dead. At the end of the series, he returns alive and takes Aiden and Meg from prison to their parents. He is assaulted by Meg in book 4.

Dr. John Falconer
John Falconer is the father of Aiden and Meg Falconer and the husband of Louise Falconer. He and his wife were both convicted of betraying their country by giving confidential information to terrorists. He also writes detective novels about a man named Mac Mulvey. Though John does not know it, Mac's stunts are duplicated by his children throughout the series, saving their lives many times.

Dr. Louise Falconer
Louise Falconer is the mother of Aiden and Meg Falconer and the wife of John Falconer. Both she and her husband were respected criminologists before the terrorist incident occurred. Her frequent flyer miles save the kids on numerous occasions, before the FBI begins tracking them.

References

External links
 On the Run on the Scholastic website
 Gordon Korman's Website

Novel series
Novels by Gordon Korman
Series of children's books
English-language novels
2005 Canadian novels
2006 Canadian novels
2000s children's books